Yali may refer to:

 Cyclone Yali (1987), a tropical cyclone that occurred during the 1986–87 South Pacific cyclone season
 Cyclone Yali, a tropical cyclone that occurred during the 1997–98 South Pacific cyclone season
 Yalı (residence), a water's edge house or mansion in Turkey
 Yali (mythology), a Hindu mythical creature with the body of a lion and some elephant features
 Yali (volcano), a Greek volcanic island
 Yali, Antioquia, a municipality in Colombia
 Yali people, a tribe of Western New Guinea
 Yali language, a language spoken by the Yali people
 Yale-China Association, known as Yali in Chinese
 Yali High School, Changsha, China
 El Yali, a Ramsar site in Chile
 Yali (politician), a New Guinean religious leader, politician and cargo cult leader.
 YALI (Linux) (Yet Another Linux Installer), an installer used for installing some Linux distributions, like Pardus.
 Yali Falls Dam
 Young African Leaders Initiative Leadership initiative of the United States Department of State.